The Nanning–Youyiguan Expressway, commonly referred to as the Nanyou Expressway, is a  in the Chinese autonomous region of Guangxi that connects the city of Nanning, the capital of Guangxi, and Friendship Pass, known in Chinese as Youyiguan, a border crossing between China and Vietnam. The Friendship Pass is located in the county-level city of Pingxiang, under the administration of the city of Chongzuo. At the border, the expressway connects with North–South expressway in Vietnam. The expressway is designated G7211, and opened on 28 December 2005.

The expressway is a spur of G72 Quanzhou–Nanning Expressway. The Nanning–Youyiguan Expressway branches off from its primary expressway, G72, just before the western terminus of G72 in Nanning. The entire route is also part of Asian Highway 1.

Along with the G7511 Qinzhou–Dongxing Expressway and G8011 Kaiyuan–Hekou Expressway, it is one of the three expressways that connect China with Vietnam.

Route

Nanning City Center 
The Nanning–Youyiguan Expressway begins east of the city centre of Nanning, at the San'an Interchange in Qingxiu District. At this interchange, it connects to the G72 Quanzhou–Nanning Expressway, its parent expressway, as well as the G7201 Nanning Ring Expressway, the G75 Lanzhou–Haikou Expressway, and the G80 Guangzhou–Kunming Expressway. It proceeds south, in a concurrency with the G7201 Nanning Ring Expressway and G75 Lanzhou–Haikou Expressway, to the Liangqing South interchange in Liangqing District, passing through Yongning District on the way. At this three way interchange, the Nanning–Youyiguan Expressway and Nanning Ring Expressway continue westward while the G75 Lanzhou–Haikou Expressway branches off to the south.

The concurrency with the G7201 Nanning Ring Expressway continues until the Gaoling Interchange in Jiangnan District, south of the city centre of Nanning, where the Nanning–Youyiguan Expressway proceeds southward, away from the city centre, while the G7201 Nanning Ring Expressway continues westward.

This section of expressway forms the southeastern part of a ring expressway around the city centre of Nanning. The orbital expressway is designated G7201 Nanning Ring Expressway. Hence, the G7201 Nanning Ring Expressway is concurrent with the Nanning–Youyiguan Expressway for this entire length, and in addition, the two expressways share exit numbers during the concurrency.

Nanning Airport Expressway 
This section first opened in October 2000, and is so named because it connects the city centre with Nanning's international airport, Nanning Wuxu International Airport. As this section was built prior to the other sections, it uses different exit numbers than those employed on the rest of the expressway (in which kilometre zero is at the San'an interchange). Instead, the exit numbers reset, with the Gaoling interchange serving as kilometre zero for this section.

This section of expressway is toll-free. Just south of the Gaoling interchange, all motorists must stop at a toll booth. Immediately after the toll booth, the Nahong exit provides access to and from the city centre of Nanning from the south.

The Nanning Airport Expressway section of the Nanning–Youyiguan expressway traverses through Jiangnan District in a southwesterly manner, ending at the Wuxu exit, where it connects to Airport Road and Nanning Wuxu International Airport.

Wuxu to Youyiguan 

This section of expressway is tolled from the Wuxu exit to the Pingxiang exit. West of the Wuxu exit, motorists must stop at a toll booth.

The expressway enters the prefecture-level city of Chongzuo immediately after the Suxu exit. At the Yuanjing exit, the Nanning–Youyiguan Expressway connects with the S60 Qinzhou–Chongzuo Expressway to the east. This exit opened along with the opening of the Qinzhou–Chongzhou expressway on 31 December 2012.

The expressway passes just south of the city centre of Chongzuo, before continuing west to the county-level city of Pingxiang. The section between Ningming County and Youyiguan parallels much of China National Highway 322 and the Hunan–Guangxi Railway.

Entering Pingxiang, motorists must stop at a toll booth, marking the end of the tolled stretch of expressway. Immediately after the toll-booth is an at-grade intersection with China National Highway 322 and Jinxiang Avenue, the only at-grade intersection on the expressway. The expressway makes a sharp turn southward toward the Vietnam border and its southwestern terminus at Youyiguan. At Youyiguan, individuals must pass through the border checkpoint before entering Vietnam. On the Vietnamese side of Youyiguan is the northern terminus of North–South Expressway.

Exit List

References

AH1
Chinese national-level expressways
Expressways in Guangxi